Nam Tae-hyun (born May 10, 1994), also known as Taehyun, is a South Korean singer, songwriter, producer and actor. In March 2017, he founded a music label, South Buyers Club. Sometime afterwards, the label was renamed to The South. Under the label, Nam debuted the band South Club, of which he is leader, main vocalist, guitarist, and main composer. He was previously the main vocalist of K-pop group Winner, in which he also composed and produced. In November 2019, Nam announced that he closed his music label and that the band had signed with new management.

Life and career

Pre-debut: Win: Who Is Next
Prior to his debut as a member of Winner, Nam performed as a backup dancer for the YG Family Concert 2011.

In 2013, he competed in the reality program Win: Who Is Next as a trainee in "Team A", which he went on to debut as a member of group Winner. Nam co-composed and co-wrote two songs that were used to compete on the show.

2014–2015: Official debut, 2014 S/S, and television appearances
Nam participated in the production of Winner's debut album, 2014 S/S, which was released in August 2014. He co-composed three songs from the album – "But (사랑하지마)", "Tonight (이 밤)" and his solo track "Confession (고백하는거야)". The album topped several charts, including the Gaon Music Chart as well as the Billboard's World Albums Chart.

In 2015, while the group was on hiatus, Nam made his acting debut on web drama Midnight Girl. That same year, he played a supporting role in the drama Late Night Restaurant. He was also cast in the joint Chinese-Korean production Under the Black Moonlight.

2016: Exit : E, television appearances, and departure from Winner
In January 2016, Nam released the single "Pricked" (사랑가시) in collaboration with Mino as a warm-up track ahead of Winner's EP Exit : E. The single charted at number two on MelOn.

After nearly 18 months of hiatus, Winner's comeback mini-album Exit : E was released on February 1. The album featured five tracks, including "Pricked", and double title tracks "Baby Baby" and "센치해 (Sentimental)". Nam played a major role in the production of both title tracks, as well as for his solo "좋더라 (I'm Young)".

In March 2016, Nam joined tvN's Actor School, a variety show featuring seven stars going through a series of trainings by actor Park Shin-yang, in order to brush up on their acting skills.

On October 12, YG Entertainment stated that Nam would be halting promotional activities and receiving treatment for mental health issues. As a result, Winner's comeback was delayed indefinitely. Later, on November 25, it was announced that he had withdrawn from the group and had terminated his contract with YG Entertainment. The following day, he posted a handwritten letter on his personal Instagram account containing his apology, gratitude to fans and pledge to return with other music and projects.

2017–present: Music creations and South Buyers Club
Nam continues sharing his music creations and covers on his SoundCloud account, including a cover of Radiohead's "Creep", Park Hyo-shin's "Beautiful Tomorrow", and "Breath (숨)". His influences arise from artists across many genres, such as Nirvana, The Beatles, The Rolling Stones, B.B. King, and Eric Clapton. He then created a Tumblr site on January 5, posting announcements and communicating with fans from time to time. On January 23, Nam started recruiting applications for his upcoming band.

On March 25, Nam, together with his rumored band, South Club, held a guerrilla show at Pet Sounds Bar in Korea. The 30-minute show was livestreamed on platforms such as Instagram, and popular China video-sharing platform Miaopai. South Club performed a total of four songs, including tracks from The Beatles and Foster the People.  On April 11, Nam announced that his music label "South Buyers Club" has officially been registered as of March 30. On May 26, South Club released the music video for their first pre-release track "Hug Me," which was a ballad rock track.

South Club's first EP 90 was released on June 27, along with music videos for the two title tracks: "Liar" and "I got the Blues.". The name of the album was inspired by the expression of freedom of youths in the 90s. It was also due to the fact that all members of the band were born after the year 1990. On July 9, the band came back with their first single titled "아니 (No)". After the member Yooni's departure, the band's first release as a four piece was the second single "누굴 위한 노래인가요 (Who Is This Song For?)", which became available for streaming on December 5, 2017.

Radio DJ
On July 31, 2017, Nam started his career as a radio DJ. He broadcast live on the Casper Radio Vlive channel on Mondays, at 11pm, to talk about various topics and to share his music with his fans. On his 32nd broadcast, on April 9, 2018, Nam announced that he would be doing his last broadcast on May 7, in order to focus more on his music.

Personal life 

Nam has been open about his struggles with bipolar disorder and depression. He stated in a November 2018 interview with Rolling Stone India that while founding his label South Buyers Club took a toll to his emotional wellbeing that he hadn't recovered from at the time, his daily effort to stay productive helped him "overcome his [feeling of] loneliness and depression". Later, he explained that "[w]hen I'm frustrated, I say that I'm frustrated—when I'm happy, I say that I'm happy." and that his approach of discussing his own mental state (and its positive influence on his fans) really isn't a "negative point of [his]" given that "[s]o many people struggle psychologically and that's just how people live".

Following the suicide of fellow K-pop idol and actress Sulli (former member of the girlgroup f(x)) in October 2019, Nam spoke out against cyberbullying and malicious commenting by netizens, stating that he had previously attempted suicide because of similar harassment.

Production credits

Discography

Singles as a lead artist

Singles as a featured artist

Filmography

Television

Drama

Reality

Other

Radio

References

External links

1994 births
Living people
21st-century South Korean singers
21st-century South Korean businesspeople
21st-century South Korean actors
YG Entertainment artists
People with bipolar disorder
People with mood disorders
People from Gyeonggi Province
South Korean male idols
South Korean male actors
South Korean male television actors
South Korean male dancers
South Korean male singers
South Korean male singer-songwriters
South Korean male pop singers
South Korean electronic music singers
South Korean rock singers
South Korean pop singers
South Korean company founders
South Korean music industry executives
South Korean record producers
Winner (band) members
21st-century South Korean male singers
21st-century South Korean male actors
Hanlim Multi Art School alumni